Biksti Manor is a manor house located in Biksti Parish, Dobele Municipality in the historical region of Zemgale, in Latvia. A two-story building constructed in rectangular shape, the estate comprises a large landscape park with rare species of trees.  The manor currently houses the  Biksti Elementary School.

History
Since 1795 manor was owned by Ropp noble family. After Latvian Agrarian Reform of 1920s family loses manor and leaves in 1927. Since 1922 new owner of estate - Agricultural Society - leased manor house and land to von Lieven family. In 1940 the von Lieven family emigrates, but the eldest family members, who stayed put at manor has been deported to Siberia. Since 1945 till present day there is a school at manor house. 

Manor house with elements of neo-gothic style in its architecture was built in 1847. Later it was rebuilt resulting in loss of original look and proportions. Today building  visibly displays classical forms. There are a lot of very valuable interior components preserved in the manor interior, such as furnaces, the heating systems, wood siding, trim and stair railings, iron balcony railings and pillars.

See also
List of palaces and manor houses in Latvia

References

Manor houses in Latvia